David Odhiambo (born 27 April 1976) is a Kenyan cricket umpire. He stood in three One Day International (ODI) games and seven Twenty20 Internationals (T20Is) between 2012 and 2015.

In January 2018, he was named as one of the seventeen on-field umpires for the 2018 Under-19 Cricket World Cup. In April 2019, he was named as one of the eight on-field umpires for the 2019 ICC World Cricket League Division Two tournament in Namibia.

See also
 List of One Day International cricket umpires
 List of Twenty20 International cricket umpires

References

1976 births
Living people
Kenyan One Day International cricket umpires
Kenyan Twenty20 International cricket umpires
Cricketers from Nairobi